Luke Anthony Freeman (born 22 March 1992) is an English professional footballer who plays for EFL Championship club Luton Town. He can play both as a midfielder or as a winger.

Freeman played at Charlton Athletic, before joining Gillingham at the age of 11. He made his first-team debut for Gillingham at the age of 15, becoming the youngest ever player to appear in the FA Cup. In January 2008, Freeman signed for Arsenal, where he played regularly for the club's under-18 and reserve teams. Ahead of the 2010–11 season, Freeman joined Yeovil Town on loan until December 2010. He returned to his parent club when his loan ended, and signed a new contract in April 2011. He was loaned out once again in November 2011, this time to League One club Stevenage on a one-and-a-half-month loan deal. Freeman played regularly during his time on loan at Stevenage, and signed for the club on a permanent basis in January 2012.

After spending three seasons at Stevenage, winning the club's Player of the Year award for the 2013–14 season, Freeman joined Bristol City in June 2014. He helped the club to Football League Trophy and League One titles during his first season with the team. Freeman spent two-and-a-half years at Bristol City before joining Queens Park Rangers, also of the Championship, for an undisclosed fee in January 2017. He was named as the club's Player of the Year for the 2018–19 season. Freeman signed for newly promoted Premier League club Sheffield United for a club-record fee in July 2019. He spent the 2020–21 season on loan at Nottingham Forest.

Early life
Born in Dartford, Kent, Freeman grew up in East London. His parents made the decision to relocate to Gravesend, Kent, where Freeman attended St John's Secondary School.

Club career

Early career
Freeman joined Charlton Athletic's academy in 2001 after being scouted playing Sunday league youth football. He spent two years at Charlton before being released "for being too small". Following his release from Charlton, Freeman joined Gillingham at the age of 11. He made his first-team debut for Gillingham in an FA Cup tie against Barnet on 10 November 2007, aged 15 years and 233 days, replacing Efe Sodje as an 80th-minute substitute. His debut set two records; he simultaneously became Gillingham's youngest first team player in team history, and the youngest player ever to appear in the FA Cup, breaking records previously held by Billy Hughes and Lee Holmes respectively. Three days after his FA Cup appearance, Freeman played in Gillingham's 4–0 home victory against Dagenham & Redbridge in the Football League Trophy, coming on as a substitute in the 74th minute. He made his first league appearance on 24 November 2007, becoming Gillingham's youngest player in a league match, as an 82nd-minute substitute as Gillingham secured a 2–1 win over Hartlepool United. After making three appearances for Gillingham, Freeman spent time on trial at Arsenal, Newcastle United and West Ham United in December 2007, with all three teams showing an interest in signing him.

Arsenal
Freeman joined Premier League club Arsenal on 30 January 2008, for a fee reported to be in the region of £200,000. He signed a two-year deal to become part of Arsenal's youth set-up on the club's scholar scheme. On signing Freeman, Arsenal manager Arsène Wenger described the player as "a very interesting prospect". During the 2008–09 season, Freeman scored seven goals from 15 appearances for the under-18 team, as well as making one substitute appearance for the reserve team during the campaign. Freeman signed professional terms with the club on 8 April 2009. During the 2009–10 campaign, Freeman scored 16 times in 24 games, including scoring two goals in the Academy League Final, a 5–3 victory over Nottingham Forest. The season also marked Freeman's first goal at reserve level against Chelsea in a 2–1 victory on 15 February 2010. He went on to make 11 appearances for Arsenal's reserve team, most of which came during the latter stages of the season.

Ahead of the 2010–11 season, Freeman signed for League One club Yeovil Town on a loan contract until 31 December 2010. On joining Yeovil Town, Freeman stated that he was now "getting to an age" where he wanted some first-team experience, and that ideally the loan move would put him in first-team contention come the end of the season. He scored on his debut against Leyton Orient on 7 August 2010, scoring the winning goal in first-half injury time in a 2–1 victory, ensuring Yeovil made a victorious start to the season. Freeman played regularly for Yeovil during the first half of the 2010–11 season, making 15 appearances and scoring two goals for the Somerset-based club. His loan spell was ended early due to injury, and Freeman returned to Arsenal in November 2010. After regaining fitness, Freeman remained at Arsenal, "continuing to impress" regularly for the reserve team, scoring four goals during the season. He signed a new contract with the club in April 2011.

Stevenage
Freeman joined League One club Stevenage on loan from 17 November 2011 to 8 January 2012, with an option to extend the agreement. He made his debut for Stevenage two days after signing for the club, playing 86 minutes in a 0–0 away draw against Leyton Orient. Freeman scored his first goal for the club in a 6–1 away victory over Colchester United on 26 December, coming on as a 57th-minute substitute and scoring Stevenage's fifth goal of the match with a "powerful close-range strike". The last game of Freeman's loan spell with the club was a 1–0 victory at Championship team Reading in the FA Cup third round.

He returned to his parent club on 8 January 2012, having played nine games and scored one goal during his loan spell. Two days later, on 10 January 2012, Freeman signed for Stevenage on a permanent basis for an undisclosed fee and on a contract until 2014. On signing for Stevenage, Freeman stated — "It's good to be at Stevenage. There were a couple of bids elsewhere, but I really enjoyed my time on loan here, so I am delighted to stay. Now it's time to build a career for myself, it's good that I've had the opportunity to be taught by one of the best, but it's time to move on and try and make myself a better player". Freeman's first game after signing for the club on a permanent basis was a 5–1 away victory at Rochdale. He scored the opening goal of the match, and then scored a second goal in the second-half with a 25-yard strike. He made 32 appearances during the season, scoring seven times, as Stevenage lost in the League One play-off semi-finals.

Freeman made his first appearance of the 2012–13 season in Stevenage's first game of the new campaign, playing the whole match in a 3–1 victory over AFC Wimbledon at Broadhall Way in the League Cup. He scored his first goal of the season in a 2–2 home draw with Crewe Alexandra on 15 September 2012, scoring courtesy of a long-range effort that found the top corner of the goal, a game in which Stevenage came from two goals down to earn a point. He struggled to maintain consistent performances throughout the middle of the season, and was regularly used as a substitute. It was to be a six-month wait for Freeman to score his next goal, curling a 25-yard free-kick to briefly restore parity in Stevenage's televised 3–1 defeat to Tranmere Rovers at Prenton Park on 24 March 2013. He made 43 appearances in all competitions during the season, scoring two goals.

Freeman remained at Stevenage for the 2013–14 season, his third season at the Hertfordshire club. He scored his first goal of the season in Stevenage's 2–1 extra-time defeat to Premier League club Everton in the League Cup on 28 August 2013, briefly giving Stevenage the lead in the first-half. In December 2013, Stevenage stated Freeman had been the subject of several enquiries from Championship clubs ahead of the 2014 January transfer window and that they would be willing to listen to offers for the player. No transfer materialised and Freeman would ultimately see out the season at Stevenage. Freeman had to wait almost four months for his next goals, scoring a "stunning brace" in the second-half helped the club secure a 3–2 victory away at Bradford City on 1 March 2014. Freeman's opening goal in the match was scored from 25-yards, whilst his second, the winning goal, was scored courtesy of a well-worked free-kick with three minutes remaining. He ended the season by scoring three times in the final five league fixtures in April 2014. Freeman played 54 times and scored eight goals during the season, as Stevenage were relegated to League Two. He was voted Stevenage's Player of the Year at the club's end-of-season awards. At the end of the season, with his contract expiring in June, Stevenage triggered a 12-month extension clause to ensure Freeman was still contracted to the club.

Bristol City
Despite Stevenage activating the 12-month clause in Freeman's contract, he signed for League One club Bristol City on 26 June 2014, joining for a six-figure fee and on a three-year deal. Freeman made his Bristol City debut on the opening day of the 2014–15 season, playing the first 77 minutes in a 2–1 away victory at Sheffield United. He scored his first goal for Bristol City in a 1–1 draw with Rochdale on 23 August 2014, latching onto Mark Little's cross in the first-half. Freeman scored twice in Bristol City's 3–0 victory against Peterborough United at London Road on 28 November 2014, taking his tally for the season to three goals. Freeman scored three times within the space of five games in February 2015 into March 2015, all three goals coming in away victories against Doncaster Rovers, Leyton Orient and Yeovil Town respectively. During the season, Freeman also made five appearances in the Football League Trophy, including a starting appearance in the final, a 2–0 victory against Walsall at Wembley Stadium on 22 March 2015. All of Freeman's seven goals during the season came in away fixtures, playing 56 times in all competitions as Bristol City earned promotion to the Championship after finishing the season as champions by an eight-point margin.

Freeman started in Bristol City's first game back in the Championship at the start of the 2015–16 season, playing the whole match as they lost 2–0 away at Sheffield Wednesday. A week later, on 15 August 2015, Freeman received the first red card of his career when he was sent-off for a high-footed challenge on Harlee Dean in a 4–2 home defeat to Brentford at Ashton Gate. Freeman served his three-match suspension and returned to the first-team in September 2015, scoring later that month in a 2–2 away draw against Ipswich Town courtesy of a deflected effort off of Tommy Smith. The goal turned out to be Freeman's solitary goal during the season, making 44 appearances in all competitions as Bristol City consolidated their place back in the second tier of English football.

He began the 2016–17 season at Bristol City, entering the final year of his three-year contract, and was a regular starter during the first half of the campaign. Freeman scored in his goal of the season in Bristol City's 4–0 victory over Fulham at Craven Cottage on 24 September 2016, scoring the second goal of the game. Bristol City manager Lee Johnson stated he was resigned to losing Freeman in the January transfer window after the player rejected the offer of a new contract. A year after his departure from Bristol City, Freeman stated that Bristol City were not forthcoming with any contract offer — "I was waiting over eight months for a contract that was so-called going to be offered to me. When they did it was really nowhere near what anyone else was on. So it was out of my hands. I probably wouldn't have left if they had offered me the contract they said they were going to offer me earlier". During his two-and-a-half years at Bristol City, Freeman made 121 appearances and scored 10 times.

Queens Park Rangers
Freeman subsequently joined fellow Championship club Queens Park Rangers (QPR) on 30 January 2017, for an undisclosed fee and on a three-and-a-half-year deal. On signing Freeman, QPR manager Ian Holloway stated "I've been a great admirer of Luke and his creativity is something we'll really feel the benefits of". He made his QPR debut two days after signing, on 1 February 2017, coming on as a 66th-minute substitute in a 2–2 draw with Newcastle United at St James' Park. Freeman scored his first goal for QPR in his next match for the club ten days later, on 11 February 2017, halving the deficit in an eventual 2–1 home defeat to Huddersfield Town. He made 16 appearances during the second half of the season for his new club, scoring two times.

The 2017–18 season served as Freeman's first full season at QPR, with the club still competing in the Championship. He scored his first goal of the season with a low shot from outside the area to double QPR's advantage in an eventual 2–1 home victory over Ipswich Town on 9 September 2017, a win that maintained QPR's unbeaten start at Loftus Road. He scored in consecutive away matches in February 2018 into March 2018, the first coming in a 2–1 loss at Sheffield United, before he appeared from the substitutes' bench to score QPR's third goal as they secured a 3–1 victory over promotion-chasing Aston Villa at Villa Park on 13 March 2018. He scored five times in 48 appearances during the season. His tally of 12 assists placed him in third in the assists ranking in the Championship that season. Freeman scored eight goals and contributed six assists for QPR during the 2018–19 season, a return that meant he was named the QPR Player of the Year at the club's end-of-season award ceremony on 26 April 2019.

Sheffield United
Following his most prolific season at QPR, Freeman joined newly promoted Premier League club Sheffield United for an undisclosed club-record fee on 3 July 2019. He made his Sheffield United debut in the club's first game back in the Premier League, coming on as a 78th-minute substitute in a 1–1 draw away at Bournemouth on 10 August 2019. Freeman played a peripheral role during the season, making 16 appearances, of which seven were starting.

Loan to Nottingham Forest
Ahead of the 2020–21 season, Freeman joined Championship club Nottingham Forest on a season-long loan agreement, with an option for a permanent transfer at the end of the season. He debuted for the club in a 1–0 defeat to Barnsley in the EFL Cup on 5 September 2020. He scored Nottingham Forest's first goal of the season in a 2–1 defeat to former club Bristol City on 3 October 2020. Freeman's season was disrupted by injuries, with the player having surgery on a hernia injury mid-season. He made 25 appearances during the season, scoring once, with Forest opting not to make the move permanent.

Return to Sheffield United and loan to Millwall
He scored his first goal for Sheffield United in an EFL Cup tie against Derby County on 24 August 2021.  In January 2022, he joined Millwall on loan for the remainder of the season. He was injured on his debut against Fulham.

Luton Town
On 4 July 2022, Freeman joined Luton Town following his release from Sheffield United.

International career
Freeman made his debut for the England under-16 team in the 2008 Montaigu Tournament in France, scoring on his debut in a 3–1 victory against Japan under-16s. Having secured six points out of nine, England won their group, and subsequently beat their French counterparts in the final on penalties, Freeman playing 78 minutes of the match.

He was called up to the England under-17 squad ahead of the 2008 Nordic Tournament, held in Sweden. He played in all three games during the tournament, with England failing to qualify for the final due to Norway's superior goal-scoring record. He played in all three of England's 2009 UEFA under-17 Championship qualification games in October 2008, scoring in a 7–0 win against Estonia under-17s. England narrowly qualified for the elite round, finishing in second place with five points. Ahead of the elite round fixtures, Freeman was called up to represent the under-17 team in the 2009 Algarve Tournament, a three-day friendly tournament, which was played in February 2009. He started in all three games as England finished third in their group, and scored once in the nation's only victory, a 4–0 win over Israel's under-17 team.

Freeman was named in England's squad to play in the elite round, the final qualification stage for the 2009 UEFA under-17 Championship. All three of England's elite round matches were played in Hungary in March 2009, with Freeman scoring the only goal of the game in England's first group game on 25 March, a 1–0 victory against Portugal. He also scored again two days later as England under-17's beat their Serbian counterparts 2–1 in Bük. He made a late substitute appearance in the final group match, a 2–0 victory against Hungary, meaning England had secured a place in the final tournament. Freeman was named in the 18-man squad for the tournament. He played in two of England's three games, with the country finishing bottom of their group with one point.

Style of play
Freeman was initially deployed solely as a winger in the early stages of his career. He has generally been used on the left side for the majority of his career due to the fact he is left-footed. He was often given a free role at Bristol City, drifting into the middle and shooting from distance. During his time at QPR, Freeman was used in more central roles as part of a midfield three under Ian Holloway. QPR manager Holloway has described Freeman as having a "wand of a left foot", as well as highlighting his creativity and desire to want the ball as plus-points. Freeman is also a set-piece specialist, proficient from corner kicks and free kicks.

Career statistics

Honours
Bristol City
Football League One: 2014–15
Football League Trophy: 2014–15

England U16
Montaigu Tournament: 2008

Individual
Football League Young Player of the Month: April 2012
Stevenage Player of the Year: 2013–14
PFA Team of the Year: 2014–15 League One
Queens Park Rangers Player of the Year: 2018–19

References

External links

 

1992 births
Living people
Sportspeople from Dartford
Footballers from Kent
English footballers
England youth international footballers
Association football forwards
Charlton Athletic F.C. players
Gillingham F.C. players
Arsenal F.C. players
Yeovil Town F.C. players
Stevenage F.C. players
Bristol City F.C. players
Sheffield United F.C. players
Nottingham Forest F.C. players
Millwall F.C. players
Luton Town F.C. players
English Football League players
Premier League players